Benjamin Kuciński (born 1 June 1982 in Katowice) is a Polish race walker.

Competition record

References

1982 births
Living people
Polish male racewalkers
Athletes (track and field) at the 2004 Summer Olympics
Olympic athletes of Poland
Sportspeople from Katowice